Chestertown may refer to:

Chestertown, Maryland, a town in Kent County, United States
Chestertown, New York, a hamlet in the Adirondacks in upstate New York, United States